A list of notable Ecuadorian musicians across all fields of music. The list is ordered in alphabetical order by surname and first name as given by the Ecuadorian dictionary of biography:

B
Bonilla Chávez, Carlos (classical guitarist)
Brescia, Domingo
Bueno Arévalo Julio Fernando

C
Leonardo Cárdenas
Christopher Velez

E
Espín Yépez, Enrique

G
Guevara Viteri Luis Gerardo
Olga Gutiérrez (1928–2015), pasillo singer
Daniela Guzmán

I
 Silvana Ibarra (born 1959), singer, actress, and politician

J
Juan Fernando Velasco

L 

 Lila Álvarez Garcia

M
Maiguashca Guevara, Mesías Declory

R
Rodas Dávila, Arturo - composer

S
Saade, Jorge - violinist
Salgado Torres Luis Humberto - composer

V
Villalba Jervis, María Gabriela

References

 
Ecuador
Musicians